Calamochrous pallidalis is a moth in the family Crambidae, of the class Insecta. It was described by George Hampson in 1900. It is found in Central Asia.

References

Moths described in 1900
Pyraustinae